This is a timeline of events in the history of the Cherokee Nation,  from its earliest appearance in historical records to modern court cases in the United States. Some basic content about the removal of other southeastern tribes to lands west of the Mississippi River is included. In a series of treaties, these tribes ceded land to the United States.

1540–1775

1775–1811

1811–1829

1830s

1830–1832

1833–1835

1836–1837

1838

1839–1840

1841–present

See also

Cherokee freedmen controversy
Cherokee removal
Cherokee treaties
Daniel Sabin Butrick (Buttrick), traveled with the Cherokee Nation on the Trail of Tears
Eastern Band of Cherokee Indians
Principal Chiefs of the Cherokee
Trail of Tears

References

Bibliography
Alderman, Pat. Dragging Canoe: Cherokee-Chickamauga War Chief. (Johnson City: Overmountain Press, 1978).
Anderson, William L. Cherokee Removal: Before and After. (Athens: University of Georgia Press, 1992).
Baker, Jack, transcriber. Cherokee Emigration Rolls 1817–1835. (Oklahoma City: Baker Publishing Co., 1977).
Blankenship, Bob. Cherokee Roots, Volume 1: Eastern Cherokee Rolls. (Cherokee: Bob Blankenship, 1992).
Brown, John P. Old Frontiers:  The Story of the Cherokee Indians from Earliest Times to the Date of Their Removal to the West, 1838. (Kingsport: Southern Publishers, 1938).
Eckert, Allan W. A Sorrow in Our Heart: The Life of Tecumseh. (New York: Bantam, 1992).
Ehle, John. The Trail of Tears: The Rise and Fall of the Cherokee Nation. (New York: Doubleday, 1989).
Evans, E. Raymond. "Notable Persons in Cherokee History: Ostenaco". Journal of Cherokee Studies, Vol. 1, No. 1, pp. 41–54. (Cherokee: Museum of the Cherokee Indian, 1976).
Evans, E. Raymond. "Notable Persons in Cherokee History: Bob Benge". Journal of Cherokee Studies, Vol. 1, No. 2, pp. 98–106. (Cherokee: Museum of the Cherokee Indian, 1976).
Evans, E. Raymond.  "Notable Persons in Cherokee History: Dragging Canoe". Journal of Cherokee Studies, Vol. 2, No. 2, pp. 176–189. (Cherokee: Museum of the Cherokee Indian, 1977).
Evans, E. Raymond, and Vicky Karhu. "Williams Island: A Source of Significant Material in the Collections of the Museum of the Cherokee". Journal of Cherokee Studies, Vol. 9, No. 1, pp. 10–34.  (Cherokee: Museum of the Cherokee Indian, 1984).
Finger, John R. The Eastern Band of Cherokees 1819–1900. (Knoxville: University of Tennessee Press, 1984).
Foreman, Grant. Indian Removal: The Emigration of the Five Civilized Tribes of Indians. (Norman: University of Oklahoma Press, 1932).
Haywood, W.H. The Civil and Political History of the State of Tennessee from its Earliest Settlement up to the Year 1796. (Nashville: Methodist Episcopal Publishing House, 1891).
King, Duane, ed. The Cherokee Indian Nation: A Troubled History. (Knoxville: University of Tennessee Press, 1979).
King, Duane, and E. Raymond Evans. "The Trail of Tears: Primary Documents of the Cherokee Removal". Journal of Cherokee Studies, Vol. 3, No. 3, pp. 130–190. (Cherokee: Museum of the Cherokee Indian, 1978).
Klink, Karl, and James Talman, ed. The Journal of Major John Norton. (Toronto: Champlain Society, 1970).
Lumpkin, Wilson. The Removal of the Cherokee Indians from Georgia. (New York: Augustus M. Kelley, 1907).
McLoughlin, William G. Cherokee Ghost Dance Movement of 1811–1813. (Macon: Mercer University Press, 1984).
McLoughlin, William G. Cherokee Renascence in the New Republic. (Princeton: Princeton University Press, 1992).
Mooney, James. Myths of the Cherokee and Sacred Formulas of the Cherokee. (Nashville: Charles and Randy Elder-Booksellers, 1982).
Moore, John Trotwood and Austin P. Foster. Tennessee, The Volunteer State, 1769–1923, Vol. 1. (Chicago: S. J. Clarke Publishing Co., 1923).
Moulton, Gary E., ed. The Papers of John Ross, Cherokee Chief. (Athens: The University of Georgia Press, 1978).
Ramsey, James Gettys McGregor.  The Annals of Tennessee to the End of the Eighteenth Century. (Chattanooga: Judge David Campbell, 1926).
Royce, Charles. The Cherokee Nation of Indians. (Chicago: Aldine Publishing Company, 1975).
Starr, Emmet. Starr's History of the Cherokee Indians. (Fayetteville: Indian Heritage Assn., 1967).
White, R. C. Cherokee Indian Removal from the Lower Hiwassie Valley. (Cleveland: Cleveland State Community College Press, 1973).
Wilkins, Thurman. Cherokee Tragedy: The Ridge Family and the Decimation of a People.. (New York: Macmillan Company, 1970).

External links
The Cherokee Nation
Annual report of the Bureau of Ethnology to the Secretary of the Smithsonian Institution (1897/98: pt.1), Contains The Myths of The Cherokee, by James Mooney
Account of 1786 conflicts between Nashville-area settlers and natives (second item in historical column)
Emmett Starr's History of the Cherokee Indians

British North America
History of the Cherokee
History of Georgia (U.S. state)
History of Kentucky
History of North Carolina
History of Tennessee
History of Virginia
Native American history of Alabama
Native American history of Oklahoma
Native American history of South Carolina
Cherokee